Bodor is a surname. Notable people with the surname include:

 Ádám Bodor (born 1936), Hungarian author
 Bob Bodor, American former college football player and coach
 Boldizsár Bodor (born 1982), Hungarian footballer
 István Bodor (1927–2000), Hungarian sprint canoeist
 László Bödör (born 1933), Hungarian footballer
 Lilla Bodor (born 1979), Hungarian painter
 Mihály Richárd Bodor (born 1962), Hungarian swimmer
 Ödön Bodor (1882–1927), Hungarian middle-distance runner and footballer
 Richárd Bodor (born 1979), Hungarian swimmer
 Tibor Bodor (1921–2000), Hungarian actor

See also
Bodo (disambiguation)
Bodorova (disambiguation)
Boudoir

de:Bodor
fr:Bodor
nl:Bodor